Hibberd is a surname. Notable people with the surname include:

Carly Hibberd (1985–2011), Australian road cyclist
Dominic Hibberd (1941–2012), English biographer
George Hibberd (1845–1911), English cricketer
Jack Hibberd (born 1940), Australian playwright
James Hibberd (born 1981), English cricketer
James Hibberd, American journalist
Julian Hibberd (born 1969), British plant scientist 
Laurie Hibberd (born 1964), American television personality
Shirley Hibberd (1825–1890), English garden writer
Stuart Hibberd (1893–1983), British radio personality
Thomas Hibberd (born 1926), Canadian ice hockey player

See also
F. C. Hibberd & Co Ltd, British locomotive-building company
Hibbard
Hibbert